Holly Maria Jones (September 14, 1992 – May 12, 2003) was a 10-year-old child abduction and murder victim from Toronto, Ontario, Canada. On May 12, 2003, while walking a friend home, she was kidnapped, sexually assaulted, and strangled by Michael Briere. After dismembering her body, Briere attempted to discard the remains by placing them in two bags and used weights to try to sink them in the Toronto Harbour. The bags were found the next morning.

Briere pleaded guilty to the crime, receiving an automatic life sentence and will not be eligible to apply for parole until 2028.

Background
Holly Maria Jones was born on September 14, 1992 to parents Maria Jones and George Stonehouse. She had three older siblings: Shauna, Natasha and James. Jones was attending St. Luigi Catholic Elementary School in the Junction Triangle neighborhood at the time of the murder. Holly was a lively, gentle, and energetic young lady with a big imagination and even bigger dreams. 

She aspired to be a famous singer because she loved music. Holly excelled in school and was a well-liked student and athlete, playing basketball and running cross-country.

Disappearance, discovery and investigation 

On May 12, 2003, Jones disappeared after walking a friend home in Toronto's west-end neighbourhood; along her route was Briere's house. Hours after her disappearance, she was reported missing, prompting a large-scale police search and an Amber Alert.

Jones' remains were discovered in two duffel bags on the shores of the Toronto Island on May 13, 2003. The area surrounding Jones' neighbourhood would see multiple attempted child abductions in the weeks following the murder and heightened police presence in the area. During a wide-scale request for samples from all men in the area where Jones had gone missing, Briere was initially suspected by police for refusing to provide a DNA sample. Police put Briere under surveillance, and obtained a DNA sample by testing his saliva on a soda can he disposed of in a public trash can. Carpet fibres from the green carpet of his apartment were matched to fibres found on Jones' remains. He was arrested and charged with her murder on June 20, 2003.

Arrest and conviction 
Michael Briere, a 35 year-old software developer, was charged with the murder at his west-end residence, near Jones' home. On June 17, 2004, Briere pleaded guilty to first-degree murder in the death of Holly Jones. In court, he attributed his actions to viewing child pornography, going on to describe his crime as "cruel, inhuman, and nightmarish", stating he wished to spare his victim's family the pain of a trial. He received an automatic life sentence and will not be eligible to apply for parole until 2028.

See also
List of kidnappings
List of solved missing person cases

References

2000s missing person cases
2003 in Ontario
2003 in Toronto
2003 murders in Canada
Child abduction in Canada
Formerly missing people
Female murder victims
Incidents of violence against girls
Missing person cases in Canada
Murder in Ontario
Rape in Canada